Polk County is a county located in the U.S. state of Texas. As of the 2020 census, its population was 50,123. Its county seat is Livingston. The county is named after James K. Polk.

The Alabama-Coushatta Indian Reservation of the federally recognized tribe is in Polk County, where the people have been since the early 19th century. They were forcibly evicted by the federal government from their traditional territory in the Southeast. The 2000 census reported a resident population of 480 persons on the reservation. The tribe reports 1100 enrolled members.

History

Polk County, named for James Knox Polk of Tennessee, President of the United States, was created by an act of the first Legislature of the State of Texas, approved on March 30, 1846, out of Liberty County, and embraced that portion from the part designated as the "Northern Division" of said county. It was one of the first of a series of 23 counties, formulated, constituted, and established by the State of Texas, after annexation to the United States.

Demographics

Note: the US Census treats Hispanic/Latino as an ethnic category. This table excludes Latinos from the racial categories and assigns them to a separate category. Hispanics/Latinos can be of any race.

As of the census of 2000,  41,133 people, 15,119 households, and 10,915 families were residing in the county. The 21,177 housing units averaged 20 per sq mi (8/km2). The racial makeup of the county was 79.64% White, 13.17% African American, 1.74% Native American, 0.38% Asian,  3.75% from other races, and 1.32% from two or more races. About 9.39% of the population was Hispanic or Latino of any race.

Of the 15,119 households, 28.80% had children under the age of 18 living with them, 57.90% were married couples living together, 10.80% had a female householder with no husband present, and 27.80% were not families. About 24.60% of all households were made up of individuals, and 12.50% had someone living alone who was 65 years of age or older. The average household size was 2.50, and the average family size was 2.95.

In the county, the population was distributed as 22.90% under the age of 18, 8.10% from 18 to 24, 26.80% from 25 to 44, 24.20% from 45 to 64, and 18.00% who were 65 years of age or older. The median age was 39 years. For every 100 females there were 108.70 males. For every 100 females age 18 and over, there were 109.50 males.

The median income for a household in the county was $30,495, and for a family was $35,957. Males had a median income of $30,823 versus $21,065 for females. The per capita income for the county was $15,834. About 13.30% of families and 17.40% of the population were below the poverty line, including 23.10% of those under age 18 and 12.30% of those age 65 or over.

Geography

Adjacent counties
 Angelina County (north)
 Tyler County (east)
 Hardin County (southeast)
 Liberty County (south)
 San Jacinto County (southwest)
 Trinity County (northwest)

National protected area
 Big Thicket National Preserve (part)

Education
School districts:
 Big Sandy Independent School District
 Chester Independent School District
 Corrigan-Camden Independent School District
 Goodrich Independent School District
 Leggett Independent School District
 Livingston Independent School District
 Onalaska Independent School District
 Woodville Independent School District

The county is in the district for Angelina College. Polk County College / Commerce Center was completed in 2013 and is located on the U.S. Highway 59 Bypass. Angelina College offers advanced curriculum study and technical training at this location. The facility provides public auditorium space and may be used as a mass shelter in a disaster event .

Government

Infrastructure

The Texas Department of Criminal Justice Allan B. Polunsky Unit is located in West Livingston. This has been the location of the  Texas death row since 1999.

Transportation

Major highways
  U.S. Highway 59
  Interstate 69 is currently under construction and will eventually follow the current route of U.S. 59 throughout most of Polk County.
  U.S. Highway 190
  U.S. Highway 287
  State Highway 146
  Farm to Market Road 350
  Farm to Market Road 356
  Farm to Market Road 357
  Farm to Market Road 942
  Farm to Market Road 943
  Farm to Market Road 1745

Mass transportation
Greyhound Lines operates the Livingston Station at the Super Stop Food Mart in Livingston.

Airport
West Livingston has the Livingston Municipal Airport, operated by the City of Livingston.

Communities

Cities
 Goodrich
 Onalaska
 Seven Oaks

Towns
 Corrigan
 Livingston (county seat)

Census-designated places
 Big Thicket Lake Estates (partly in Liberty County)
 Cedar Point
 Indian Springs
 Pleasant Hill
 West Livingston

Unincorporated communities

 Ace
 Asia
 Barnum
 Blanchard
 Camden
 Dallardsville
 East Tempe
 Leggett
 Moscow

Ghost town
 Laurelia

Notable people
 Percy Foreman - notable criminal defense attorney
 John Wesley Hardin - Old West gunslinger
 William P. Hobby - Governor of Texas, publisher of Houston Post
 Sam Houston, general of the revolution to achieve independence and President of the Republic of Texas,  spent much time in Polk County, including making peace treaties with the Alabama-Coushata Indians.
 Margo Jones - stage director who launched the careers of Tennessee Williams and Ray Walston and directed Williams' The Glass Menagerie on Broadway
 René-Robert Cavelier, Sieur de La Salle, noted French explorer of the 17th century, was likely killed in Polk County.
 Sally Mayes was a Broadway actress and singer. Livingston named a street in her honor.
 Mark Moseley, professional football player, won Super Bowl XVII and was awarded 1982 MVP as a placekicker.
 Moon Mullican - musician, "King of the Hillbilly Piano Players"
 Captain (Ike) Isaac Newton Moreland Turner was a Confederate captain who joined the Civil War from Polk County, with units called the Texas Brigade; his remains were returned here from Georgia and were reinterred in his family cemetery on April 15, 1995.
 Annette Gordon-Reed (born November 19, 1958, in Livingston, Texas) is an American historian, Pulitzer Prize-winning author, and law professor noted for changing scholarship on Thomas Jefferson regarding his relationship with Sally Hemings and her children.

Politics

United States Congress

See also

 List of counties in Texas
 National Register of Historic Places listings in Polk County, Texas
 Recorded Texas Historic Landmarks in Polk County

References

External links

 
 Polk County (TXGenWeb)
 

 
1846 establishments in Texas
Populated places established in 1846